Spain took part in the Eurovision Song Contest 1976. The country was represented by Braulio with the song "Sobran las palabras". The entry was selected through a national final. It was the first national final organized by TVE since 1971 and the last one until 2000.

Before Eurovision

National final 
The national final took place at TVE's studios in Madrid, hosted by Pilar Cañada and Jana Escribano. It consisted of three shows: the first fourteen songs were presented on 8 February 1976, the other fourteen songs on 15 February, and the final results were revealed on 28 February. 14 performers participated, each one with two songs, and the winner was chosen by postcard voting.

At Eurovision
Braulio was the 12th to perform in the running order, following Finland and preceding Italy. He received 11 points for his performance, coming 16th in a field of 18. The members of the Spanish jury included Alfonso Lapeña (chairperson and Head of Broadcasting), Francisco Otero Besteiro (sculptor), Ángel Nieto (motorcycle racer), Javier Escrivá (actor), Mercedes Alonso (actress), Pilar Trenas (journalist), Pedro Gutiérrez "El Niño de la Capea" (bullfighter), Florentino Casanova (student), Rita Aragón (actress), Ana Alonso (student) and Cristina Galbó (actress).

Voting

References

1976
Countries in the Eurovision Song Contest 1976
Eurovision